Dharamvir Bharati (25 December 1926 – 4 September 1997) was a renowned Hindi poet, author, playwright and a social thinker of India. He was the chief editor of the popular Hindi weekly magazine Dharmayug, from 1960 till 1987.

Bharati was awarded the Padma Shree for literature in 1972 by the Government of India. His novel Gunaho Ka Devta became a classic. Bharati's Suraj ka Satwan Ghoda is considered a unique experiment in story-telling and was made into a National Film Award-winning movie by the same name in 1992 by Shyam Benegal. Andha Yug, a play set immediately after the Mahabharata war, is a classic that is frequently performed in public by drama groups[3].

He was awarded the Sangeet Natak Akademi Award in Playwriting (Hindi) in 1988, given by Sangeet Natak Akademi, India's National Academy of Music, Dance and Drama.

Early life
Dharamvir Bharati was born on 25 December 1926 in a Kayastha Family of Allahabad to Chiranji Lal and Chanda devi. The family underwent considerable financial hardships after his father died early. He had a sister, Dr. Veerbala.

He did his MA in Hindi from Allahabad University in 1946 and won the "Chintamani Ghosh Award" for securing highest marks in Hindi.

Dharamvir Bharati was the sub-editor for magazines Abhyudaya and Sangam during this period. He completed his PhD in 1954 under Dr. Dhirendra Verma on the topic of "Siddha Sahitya" and was appointed lecturer in Hindi at Allahabad University. The 1950s were the most creative period in Bharati's life: He wrote many novels, dramas, poems, essays, and critical works during this phase.

Journalism (Mumbai)
In 1960 he was appointed as chief-editor of the popular Hindi weekly magazine Dharmayug by the Times Group and moved to Bombay. He remained the editor of Dharmayug till 1987. During this long phase the magazine became the most popular Hindi weekly of the country and reached new heights in Hindi journalism. As a field reporter, Bharati personally covered the Indo-Pak war that resulted in the liberation of Bangladesh.

Personal life
Dr Bharati married in 1954 and later divorced Kanta Bharati with whom he had a daughter: Parmita. A few years later he remarried and had a son Kinshuk Bharati and a daughter Pragya Bharati with Pushpa Bharati.

Bharati developed heart ailments and died after a brief illness in 1997.

Prominent works

Novels

Gunaho Ka Devta (गुनाहों का देवता) (1949)
Suraj ka Satwan Ghoda (सूरज का सातवां घोड़ा, 1952) (The Seventh Steed of the Sun) — A short novel published in 1952 that may be viewed as a set of connected mini-narratives can be called one of the foremost instances of metafiction in 20th century Hindi literature. The protagonist is a young man named Manik Mulla who recounts these tales to his friends. The name of the work is an allusion to Hindu mythology according to which the chariot of the Sun-God Surya is said to be drawn by seven horses. (viz. seven days in a week). This novella has been translated into Bengali by poet Malay Roy Choudhury of Hungry generation fame, for which he was bestowed with the Sahitya Academy Award. Shyam Benegal's film by the same name (1992), based on the novel, won the National Film Award for Best Actor.
Giyara sapno ka desh (ग्यारह सपनों का देश)
Prarambh va Samapan (प्रारंभ व समापन)

Poetry

Kanupriya, Thanda Loha, Saat Geet Varsh, Sapana Abhi Bhi and Toota Pahiya are amongst his most popular works of poetry. Toota Pahiya tells a story of how a broken wheel helped Abhimanyu in the Mahabharata war.

Play in poetry

Andha Yug (The Age of Blindness) is a poetic play. Structured on events in the Mahabharata, Andha Yug focuses on the last day of the Mahabharata war. It is a powerful metaphorical work. It has been directed by Ebrahim Alkazi, Raj Bisaria, M.K. Raina, Ratan Thiyam, Arvind Gaur, Ram Gopal Bajaj, Mohan Maharishi, Bhanu Bharti [Pravin kumar gunjan ]and many other Indian theatre directors.

Story collections

Drow Ka gaon (र्दों का गाव), Swarg aur Prathvhi (स्वर्ग और पृथ्वी), Chand aur Tute hue Log (चाँद और टूटे हुए लोग), Band gali Ka Aakhkri Makaan (बंद गली का आखिरी मकान), Saas ki Kalam se (सास की कलम से), Samasta Kahaniya ek Saath (समस्त कहानियाँ एक साथ)

Essays

Thele par Himalayas (ठेले पर हिमालय), Pashyanti stories: Ankahi (पश्यंती कहानियाँ :अनकही), The river was thirsty (नदी प्यासी थी), Neel Lake (नील झील), Human values and literature (मानव मूल्य और साहित्य), Cold iron (ठंडा लोहा)

Film about Bharati

Dr. Bharati: documentary directed by young story writer Uday Prakash for Sahitya Akademi, Delhi, 1999

Awards
Padma Shri by the Government of India, 1972
Rajendra Prasad Shikhar Samman
Bharat Bharati Samman
Maharashtra Gaurav, 1994
Kaudiya Nyas
Vyasa Samman
1984, Valley turmeric best journalism awards
1988, best playwright Maharana Mewar Foundation Award
1989, the Sangeet Natak Akademi, Delhi

Translations

 Andha Yug: Dharamvir Bharati, translated in English by Alok Bhalla, published by Oxford University Press. ,

References

External links
 Official website of Dharamvir Bharati
 Dharamvir Bharti at Kavita Kosh  (Hindi)
 Remembring Bharati Ji: An article by his sister Dr. Veerbala: यादें भैया की 
 Remembering Bharati Ji: An article by Prof. Rajiv Krishna Saxena: मामा जीः कुछ संस्मरण 

1926 births
1997 deaths
Writers from Allahabad
University of Allahabad alumni
Hindi-language writers
Hindi journalists
Hindi-language poets
Hindi theatre
Hindi dramatists and playwrights
Academic staff of the University of Allahabad
Indian male dramatists and playwrights
Indian male journalists
Indian magazine editors
Indian male novelists
Recipients of the Padma Shri in literature & education
Recipients of the Sangeet Natak Akademi Award
20th-century Indian novelists
20th-century Indian poets
20th-century Indian dramatists and playwrights
Indian male poets
Poets from Uttar Pradesh
Journalists from Uttar Pradesh
20th-century Indian journalists
Dramatists and playwrights from Uttar Pradesh
20th-century Indian male writers